Polina Sergeyevna Orlova (born ) is a Russian group rhythmic gymnast. She is the 2021 World Group All-around champion.

Career
She started training rhythmic gymnastics at age four in her hometown Pushkino, Moscow. 

She competed at several international tournaments as individual and switched to group in 2020. After being in reserve team, she was selected to compete at the 2021 World Championships as a member of Russian national group. Together with Alisa Tishchenko, Anastasia Bliznyuk, Angelina Shkatova and Maria Tolkacheva, she won gold medals in Group All-around and Team event.

References

External links
 

2002 births
Living people
Russian rhythmic gymnasts
Gymnasts from Moscow
Medalists at the Rhythmic Gymnastics World Championships
21st-century Russian women